The ZX Spectrum character set is the variant of ASCII used in the ZX Spectrum family computers. It is based on ASCII-1967 but the characters ^, ` and DEL are replaced with ↑, £ and ©. It also differs in its use of the C0 control codes other than the common BS and CR, and it makes use of the 128 high-bit characters beyond the ASCII range. The ZX Spectrum's main set of printable characters and system font are also used by the Jupiter Ace computer.

Printable characters 

Standard US-ASCII, 0x20–0x7F, is included in the Spectrum character set except that code point 0x5E is an up-arrow (↑) instead of a caret (^), 0x60 is the pound sign (£) instead of the grave accent (`), and 0x7F is the copyright sign (©) instead of the control character DEL. Note that the use of 0x5E as ↑ was also the case in the older 1963 version of ASCII. The £ sign was not mapped to 0x23 as in the British variant of ASCII (ISO-646-GB), allowing both the pound sign and the number sign (#) simultaneously. The ↑ character is the exponentiation operator in Spectrum's BASIC, just like the ^ it replaces compared to ASCII-1967 is used for exponentiation in many other dialects of BASIC and other programming languages.

Beyond 0x7F, the Spectrum character set uses the high-bit range 0x80–0xFF for special purposes. 0x80–0x8F contain the same 2×2 block graphics characters that the ZX80 character set and the ZX81 character set have (at other locations), also available in the Block Elements Unicode block. However the ZX Spectrum's standard character set does not include the ZX80/81 50% dithered 1×2 block graphics characters. Code points 0x90–0xA4 contain the originally 21 User-Defined Graphics (UDG) characters, and 0xA5–0xFF contain BASIC keywords tokenized as single code points. In the 128 BASIC mode introduced later, this was changed to 19 UDG characters ending at 0xA2 followed by the two new tokens SPECTRUM and PLAY. Code points 0xC7–0xC9 are the two-character operators <=, >= and <>, similarly tokenized into single code points. These tokens allow a BASIC command like PRINT to be entered with the single keypress  at the beginning of a line (i.e. in command mode), which generated 0xF6. That is displayed as the full keyword PRINT on screen but only a single byte token is stored so only that single byte need be parsed by the interpreter or saved to/loaded from external storage such as tape.

All non-UDG Spectrum characters can be mapped to Unicode. The three non ASCII-1967 characters ↑, £ and © are at U+2191, U+00A3 and U+00A9. The 2×2 block graphics characters are in the Block Elements block at U+2580–U+259F although font support for the latter is not universal.

The shape of the UDG characters is mapped to a RAM memory area and is initialized to copies of characters A-U, but can be redefined arbitrarily for example using the BASIC command POKE. Like all characters in the system font they use an 8×8 pixel grid stored in 8 bytes. Redefining them changes their appearance in subsequent PRINT statements but it does not change any UDG characters already drawn on the screen. The location of a UDG character's definition can be determined with the BASIC function USR with the character as the argument, e.g. USR "A" for the first one. By default this points to the last 168 (21×8) bytes of RAM at memory addresses 65368 (0xFF58) to 65535 (0xFFFF) for a 48K Spectrum. The location is pointed to by the system variable UDG which can be found at memory address 23675/6 (0x5C7B/C) and can be changed. The TK90X, a Brazilian clone of the ZX Spectrum included an in ROM application to graphically edit these UDG characters, along with functionality to preload then with accented letters used in Portuguese. (For this, the TK90X defined two extra Basic commands at the codes 0 and 1, respectively TRACE and UDG)

The definition of the main system font, 32 (space) to 127 (copyright), are referenced by the system variable CHARS which can be found at memory address 23606/7 (0x5C36/7). It is defined as 256 bytes lower than the first byte of the space character, simplifying the formula for locating a character to CHARS+8×code point. The CHARS value defaults to the value 15360 (0x3C00), with the system font at the end of the Spectrum's ROM at address 15616 (0x3D00) to 16383 (0x3FFF). Entire alternative fonts can be loaded into RAM and the CHARS variable re-pointed accordingly.

Control codes 
In the control codes area (the C0 range), the Spectrum mostly uses proprietary controls, such as INK and PAPER to control foreground and background colour. However, the common BS and CR code points are the same as in ASCII. Cursor-down (0x0A, ASCII Line Feed) can be simulated with 32 spaces printed with OVER 1 (transparent overprint) and cursor-up 0x0B (ASCII Vertical Tabulation) can be simulated with 32 backspaces. The system ROM has a fault which prevents cursor-right at 0x09 (c.f. ASCII Horizontal Tabulation) from working.

Control code 0x0E is used to indicate that a floating-point number follows, to accelerate text processing. In a Sinclair BASIC program numeric constants are stored as ASCII followed by a 0x0E byte and a 5-byte binary floating point representation. When listing a BASIC program only the ASCII part is used but at runtime only the binary representation is used. Some Spectrum programs exploited this to obfuscate numbers, while others did so to save memory. For example, a BASIC line displayed as GO TO 10 could contain the ASCII characters for digits 1 and 0 followed by a 0x0E byte and the floating-point representation of 100 instead of 10. Anyone listing that program saw the number 10, but when executed the program jumped to line 100.

Undefined codes 
Ranges 0x00–0x05, 0x07, 0x0A–0x0C, 0x0F and 0x17–0x1F are undefined. In most cases, they will produce a question mark if printed to the display. However, they may be used to represent their literal numeric values in conjunction with certain control codes: for example, 0x10 + 0x07 sets the ink (foreground text) colour to colour number 7 (white).

Character set

Notes

References

External links 
 Sinclair Spectrum+ 48K Character Set From Michael Zaretski's website
 Mapping table from Sinclair Spectrum+ 48K Character Set to Unicode From the same site
 The floating point package

 Sinclair Basic Manual, Steven Vickers, Robin Bradbeer (ed.); pub. Sinclair Research Limited. Online copy at World of Spectrum

See also 
 ZX80 character set
 ZX81 character set
 PETSCII
 ATASCII
 Atari ST character set
 Extended ASCII

Character sets
Character set
Computer-related introductions in 1982